Finnish Baptist Church is a registered religious community that acts as the umbrella organization of the Finnish-speaking Baptist churches in Finland. The Baptist Church of Finland has highest number of congregations in Central Finland. The largest congregations are located in Jyväskylä, Tampere and Turku. The number of registered members in the church was 1,442 in 2013, and around 1800 as of today.

The Finnish Baptist Church became officially registered in 1889.

Beliefs 
Many among the Finnish Baptist church have been influenced doctrinally by Lutheranism. Finnish Baptists generally aren't Charismatic, though some have moderate continuationist views.

The Finnish Baptist Church does not ordain women and is theologically conservative.

References

Organisations based in Finland
Protestantism in Finland
History of Christianity in Finland
Baptist Christianity in Finland